The last election for the Mississippi Legislature was held in November 2003, with the election winners meeting in January 2004, to begin their four year terms of office.

Party breakdown

Senate

House of Representatives

Officers

Senate

Presiding Officer

House of Representatives

Presiding Officer

Members of the Mississippi State Senate, 2004-2008

Members of the Mississippi State House of Representatives, 2004-2008

References
State of Mississippi Legislature website

2007 U.S. legislative sessions
2008 U.S. legislative sessions
Mississippi legislative sessions